The XVII 2012 Pan Am Badminton Championships were held in Lima, Peru, between October 11 and October 14, 2012.

This event was part of the 2012 BWF Grand Prix Gold and Grand Prix series of the Badminton World Federation.

Venue
Coliseo Manuel Bonilla, Miraflores, Lima

Medalists

References

 BWF Tournament Calendar 2012
 http://www.tournamentsoftware.com/sport/winners.aspx?id=DA1B3725-9390-4F00-B96E-3FC55111FF36
 http://www.tournamentsoftware.com/sport/drawsheet.aspx?id=9FD7E48D-B4E3-45EC-8CC8-4FFA7AE9049B&draw=3

External links
Official website
TournamentSoftware.com: Individual Results
TournamentSoftware.com: Team Results

Pan Am Badminton Championships
Pan Am Badminton Championships
Pan Am Badminton Championships
Sports competitions in Lima
Badminton tournaments in Peru